Joseph Vincent Pascale (April 17, 1946 – March 28, 2021) was a former American football player and coach. He served as the head football coach at Idaho State University in 1976, compiling a record of 0–9. Joe Pascale later worked as a defensive assistant for the Phoenix Cardinals, Cincinnati Bengals and San Diego Chargers of the National Football League (NFL).

Head coaching record

References

External links
 Pro Football Archives coaching statistics
 Pro-Football-Reference coaching statistics

1946 births
Living people
American football defensive linemen
American football linebackers
UConn Huskies football coaches
UConn Huskies football players
Cincinnati Bengals coaches
Idaho State Bengals football coaches
Montreal Alouettes coaches
Ottawa Rough Riders coaches
Phoenix Cardinals coaches
Princeton Tigers football coaches
Rhode Island Rams football coaches
San Diego Chargers coaches
St. Louis Cardinals (football) coaches
United States Football League coaches
Players of American football from New York City
Sportspeople from Greenwich, Connecticut
Players of American football from Connecticut